The Housing, Planning and Lands Bureau is a former policy bureau of the Government of Hong Kong, which was responsible for urban planning policy, public housing and the management and selling of public lands. It was headed by the Secretary for Housing, Planning and Lands.

The bureau was established in 2002, and was abolished in 2007. Its scope was transferred to the Transport and Housing Bureau and the Development Bureau.

See also
 Government Secretariat (Hong Kong)

Hong Kong government departments and agencies